The 1999–2000 Slovak First Football League (known as the Mars superliga for sponsorship reasons) was the seventh season of first-tier football league in Slovakia, since its establishment in 1993. This season started on 24 July 1999 and ended on 17 May 2000. ŠK Slovan Bratislava are the defending champions.

Format changes
The season was the last one in which 16 teams competed, as Mars superliga decided that the league would be reduced to 10 teams the following season. Therefore, seven teams were relegated to the 2. Liga and only one was promoted from the 2. Liga.

Teams
A total of 16 teams was contested in the league, including 14 sides from the 1998–99 season and two promoted from the 2. Liga.

FC Rimavská Sobota and BSC JAS Bardejov was relegated to the 1999–2000 2. Liga. The two relegated teams were replaced by FK DAC 1904 Dunajská Streda and FK VTJ Koba Senec.

Stadiums and locations

League table

Results

Season statistics

Top scorers

See also
1999–2000 Slovak Cup
1999–2000 2. Liga (Slovakia)

References

External links
RSSSF.org (Tables and statistics)

Slovak Super Liga seasons
Slovak
1